HO-1 may refer to:

 Sud-Ouest YHO-1, the Sud-Ouest Djinn
 Heme oxygenase 1, an enzyme that is induced in response to stress
 Hiller HO-1 Pawnee, redesignated as Hiller VZ-1 Pawnee
 Ho-1 cannon, a Japanese autocannon of World War II
 Cherry Grove, HO-1, a site on the National Register of Historic Places in Maryland
 (8037) 1993 HO1, a near-Earth asteroid

See also
 OH-1, Ohio's 1st congressional district
 Kawasaki OH-1